The ROH World Television Championship is a professional wrestling world television championship in the Ring of Honor (ROH) promotion. With the introduction of the ROH World Television Championship, the television type championship returned to national exposure. The current champion is Samoa Joe, who is in his first reign.

History
On January 20, 2010, the creation of the ROH World Television Championship was announced via ROH's official website. An eight-man single elimination tournament was then planned to determine the inaugural champion. The tournament was to start on February 4 and conclude on February 6 at The Arena in Philadelphia, Pennsylvania at the tapings of ROH's television program Ring of Honor Wrestling. Regarding the new championship addition, ROH President Cary Silkin said: "We've been talking about adding a secondary championship for some time. Not only will this give the athletes of Ring of Honor another tremendous goal to work towards, it will also give our great partner, HDNet, a championship that is sure to be defended on the television program. We’re happy to publicly give thanks to HDNet for giving us the chance to add this title to the television show."

It is ROH's second secondary singles championship in their history. The first secondary singles championship, the ROH Pure Championship, was initially used from February 14, 2004, until it was unified with the ROH World Championship on August 12, 2006. The ROH Pure Championship would ultimately return as a secondary singles championship in January 2020. After the ROH World Television Championship announcement, wrestling columnist James Caldwell gave his comments: "I like the idea. It gives mid-card wrestlers on ROH's roster something to fight for in the context of trying to win a wrestling match to "move up the company ladder." Caldwell further remarked that "ROH bringing back the TV Title to national TV is consistent with ROH's current marketing under Jim Cornette to "re-capture an old-school flavor" to their product."

After the Ring of Honor Wrestling show was canceled in March 2011, the title became inactive. Although Daniels stopped defending it, he still carried the belt with him as part of his villainous character. With the sale of ROH to the Sinclair Broadcast Group, and a new television show scheduled to air in September, ROH reinstated the title for June's Best in The World event.

Inaugural championship tournament (2010) 

The inaugural championship tournament was scheduled to span over a two-day weekend, starting on February 5, 2010, and ending on February 6 at events recorded for later broadcast on Ring of Honor Wrestling. However, due to severe weather conditions in the Philadelphia area, the second day of taping was canceled. It was not until almost a month later, on March 5, that ROH held the second recorded event, which closed out the tournament. The first four seeds of eight in the tournament were announced on January 22, 2010: Rhett Titus (8), El Generico (7), Eddie Edwards (6), and Delirious (5). The other four seeds were announced on January 26, 2010: Kevin Steen (1), Kenny King (2), Colt Cabana (3), and Davey Richards (4). The first round was determined at the first event on February 5, with Steen, King, Richards, and Edwards all advancing to round two. On March 5, Edwards and Richards both advanced to the final, where Edwards defeat Richards to be crowned the first ROH World Television Champion. The matches were scheduled to span over six episodes of Ring of Honor Wrestling. The first match from round one that aired pitted Steen against Titus, which Steen won, on the March 8 episode. On the same episode, King versus El Generico was featured, with King advancing. Cabana versus Edwards was the third match from round one to air, when it was broadcast on the March 15 episode. Richards defeated Delirious in the final match from round one, which aired later in the same episode. The first match from round two, Steen versus Edwards, was featured on the April 12 episode, in which Edwards advanced to the final. On the April 19 episode, Richards defeated King to advance to the final. On the April 26 episode, Edwards defeated Richards in the final of the tournament to become the first ROH World Television Champion.

Tournament Bracket

Belt designs

The first championship belt design was introduced on March 5, 2010, when it was given to the newly crowned inaugural champion Eddie Edwards. The physical championship belt was designed by All Star Championship Belts d/b/a ASCB, LLC. The title's base was a black leather strap that was covered with four small silver plates. The center of the title had one large silver plate. All plates had an inner blue covering. The two small outer plates had a caricature of the earth and a satellite in orbit. The middle plates had figures resembling a cameraman filming a television production. Underneath each figure were the ROH logo and the words "Ring of Honor Wrestling". The central plate had the engravings of the ROH logo as well as the statement "World Television Wrestling Champion" hovering above the backdrop of a city, with a television lying on top of a globe with an overhead shot of a wrestling ring between them in front of the skyline. 

In November 2012, the design was changed during the reign of Adam Cole. The new design seemed to be based on the WCW World Six-Man Tag Team Championship. 

Between 2014 and 2015, during Jay Lethal's second record-setting reign, the belt design was modified to emphasize the "ROH Champion" portion of the title. Lethal claimed the Television championship was more prestigious than the ROH World Championship since he was the champion.

In January 2018, in addition to other ROH championship belts, the ROH World Television Championship received a new design.

Reigns

Eddie Edwards was the inaugural champion. Jay Lethal's second reign is the longest at 567 days, while Will Ospreay's reign is the shortest at 2 days. Lethal also has the longest combined reign at 798 days. Minoru Suzuki is the oldest champion, winning the title at the age of 53, while Adam Cole is the youngest when he won the title at 22 years.

Samoa Joe is the current champion in his first reign. He defeated Minoru Suzuki on April 13, 2022 in New Orleans, Louisiana on AEW Dynamite.

Notes

References
General

Specific

External links
  ROH World Television Title History at Cagematch.net

Ring of Honor championships
World professional wrestling championships
Television wrestling championships
2010 in professional wrestling